Riachuelo (S40) is a Brazilian Riachuelo-class submarine built for the Brazilian Navy by DCNS in Cherbourg and ICN in Itaguaí, Brazil.

The Brazilian boats are larger in length, tonnage and cargo capacity compared to the French Scorpène class they are derived from.

Program history 
In 2008, Brazil purchased four enlarged Scorpènes for USD 10 billion with a total technology transfer agreement and a second agreement to develop the first Brazilian nuclear-powered submarine, . The hull of Riachuelo was laid down at Cherbourg, France on 27 May 2010 and it was jumboized at the Brazilian Navy Shipyard in Itaguaí in late 2012.

Riachuelo was launched on 14 December 2018, and began sea trials in September 2019, the Humaitá was launched on 11 December 2020.

Development and design 
The first stage of construction of the submarine took place in France, at the headquarters of DCNS in Cherbourg, with the cutting of the first steel plates of the structure. At this point, technology transfer from French technicians to Brazilians began. In the middle of 2013, internal parts manufactured in France arrived, which were then integrated to the other parts built in Brazil. In September 2015, the first construction stage was completed, with the delivery of the last section of resistant hull.

The initial Navy predictions for the delivery of Riachuelo were for 2015, however, after some postponements, the boat was launched in 2018, in order to start the platform acceptance testing phase, with two years in duration, plus six months of tests of the combat systems, with its incorporation to the operative sector foreseen for the middle of 2021. The commissioning of Riachuelo took place on 1 September 2022.

The other boats of the Brazilian class are Humaitá (S41), Tonelero (S42) and Angostura (S43).

Namesake
The Riachuelo is the seventh boat of the Brazilian Navy to receive this name, in honor of the Battle of Riachuelo, which took place in 1865, in the Paraguayan War.

The others were:
Riachuelo - Yacht.
Riachuelo - Steamboat, later renamed Marquês de Caxias.
Riachuelo - Flat-bottomed boat.
  - Steam battleship of the Imperial Brazilian Navy (1883–1910)

References 

Attack submarines
Riachuelo-class submarine
Ships built in Brazil
Ships built in France
2018 ships
Submarines of Brazil